Vicente González may refer to:

Vicente González (footballer), Argentine footballer
Vicente González (governor), governor of Spanish Florida
Vicente Gonzalez (politician), American politician from Texas
Vicente González Moreno (1778-1839), Spanish general
Vicente García González (1833-1886), General in the Cuban Ten Years' War
Vicente González Lizondo (1942-1996), Spanish politician and co-founder of the regional party Valencian Union